The University of Idaho (U of I, or UIdaho) is a public land-grant research university in Moscow, Idaho. It is the state's land-grant and primary research university, and the lead university in the Idaho Space Grant Consortium. The University of Idaho was the state's sole university for 71 years, until 1963. Its College of Law, established in 1909, was first accredited by the American Bar Association in 1925.

Formed by the Idaho Territory legislature on January 30, 1889, the university opened its doors in 1892 on October 3, with an initial class of 40 students. The first graduating class in 1896 contained two men and two women. It has an enrollment exceeding 12,000, with over 11,000 on the Moscow campus. The university offers 142 degree programs, from accountancy to wildlife resources, including bachelor's, master's, doctoral, and specialists' degrees, and accompanying honors programs. Certificates of completion are offered in 30 areas of study. At 25% and 53%, its 4 and 6 year graduation rates are the highest of any public university in Idaho, and it generates 74 percent of all research money in the state, with research expenditures of $100 million in 2010 alone. It is classified among "R2: Doctoral Universities – High research activity".

The school is home to the Idaho Vandals, who compete in NCAA Division I athletics. In addition to the main campus in Moscow, the U of I has branch campuses in Coeur d'Alene, Boise, and Idaho Falls. It also operates a research park in Post Falls, and dozens of extension offices statewide.

History

On January 30, 1889, Governor Edward Stevenson of the Idaho Territory signed the territorial legislature's Council Bill No. 20, which officially established the UI as the upcoming state's land-grant institution.  Nearly four years later, the university opened for classes on October 3, 1892.
The choice of location for the University of Idaho was an "Olive Branch of Peace" by Gov. Stevenson for his actions in styming the nearly successful effort to detach the north Idaho Panhandle and join the state of Washington.

On November 13, 2022, four University of Idaho students were stabbed to death in an off-campus rented home in Moscow, Idaho.

Campus

Administration Building
The east-facing Administration Building, with its  clock tower and Collegiate Gothic-style structure, was built from 1907 to 1909 and has become an icon of the university. The building holds classrooms, an auditorium, and administrative offices, including the offices of the President and Provost. Multiple expansions were made, with the north wing added in 1912, the eastern portion of the south wing in 1916 (extended west in 1936 for the library), and the functional annex in 1950, incorporated into the Albertson addition of 2002. The U of I library was housed in the Administration building until 1957, when the Library building opened, constructed on the former site of tennis courts. The College of Law occupied the south wing until its building (Menard) opened in 1973.

Unfortunately, it was reduced to embers on March 30, 1906. The cause of the fire, which began in the basement, was never determined, but was likely accidental. After the fire, there was debate whether to rebuild from the remains or start from scratch; the remaining structure was eventually deemed infeasible to recover and was demolished with dynamite. The original building's steps were saved and climb the small hill immediately southeast of the south wing.

In the meantime, classes were held at sites in Moscow; the Carnegie library, the Methodist church, and local lodge halls. Insurance policies paid $135,000, but the new building cost twice that. To appease the state legislature, the U of I Regents decided to build Morrill Hall first, use it for classrooms, and finance the new Administration building over three years.

The new Administration building was designed by prominent Boise architect John E. Tourtellotte. He designed the state's Roman Revival capitol building in Boise and other buildings, both public and private. Tourtellotte modeled the new U of I structure after the venerable Hampton Court Palace in England, and construction began in 1907.

The 1909 Administration building was added to the National Register of Historic Places in 1978, at age 69. Two years out of office, former U.S. president Theodore Roosevelt spoke outside the main east entrance of the new building on April 9, 1911, on a platform built of Palouse wheat.

Hello Walk

"Hello Walk" is one of the best-known and traveled pathways on the Idaho campus. But more than being surrounded by trees and grass, it navigates through a rich history of statues, landmarks, and traditions. It includes monuments such as Presidential Grove, where historical figures, such as Teddy Roosevelt and his wife, planted trees; the Spanish–American War memorial statue who had his hands cut off but was reconstructed by the handless sculptor Bud Washburn; and Administration Lawn that was designed by the Olmsted Brothers, the famous firm that also designed Central Park in New York City.

Hello Walk is still used, but the hellos that used to be mandatory are now not often vocalized to strangers.

Idaho Student Union Building
The Idaho Student Union Building, (ISUB) completed in 2000 as the Commons, is the heart of campus and contains a food court, copy center, bagel and coffee shop (Einstein's Bagels), Credit Union, and convenience store. Additionally, there is study space, wireless internet, laptop checkout, and many student services such as the offices of the Associated Students of the University of Idaho (ASUI), Academics Assistance, the University of Idaho Writing Center, and Student Support.

With the completion of the Teaching and Learning Center (TLC) at the beginning of the fall semester of 2005, the second phase, the Idaho Student Union Building gained classrooms and completed the vision of a common area where students could learn, study, relax, and get university services all in one place.

Bruce M. Pitman Center
The Bruce M. Pitman Center is located on the east end of campus on Deakin Street. The building houses the university's financial aid, admissions, new student services, registrar and Graduate & Professional Student Association (GPSA) offices. For students, the Pitman Center also features meeting rooms, a computer lab, wireless access, borrowable laptops and a movie theater. The building began as a motel, the Blue Bucket Inn, which UI purchased in 1936 and later expanded. The VandalStore, built in 1989 on a former parking lot, is located directly across the street to the east; it was previously adjacent to the south.

UI student-run media offices are also present on the third floor of the Pitman Center: The Argonaut, a newspaper; KUOI-FM, a radio station; student media advertising; and Blot, a magazine.

In October 2014, the University of Idaho announced the renaming of the Student Union Building as Bruce M. Pitman Center in honor of the retiring dean of students and vice provost for student affairs, who had served the campus community for more than 41 years. The name change took effect on January 1, 2015.

ASUI-Kibbie Activity Center

UI's multi-purpose "Kibbie Dome" is the primary home to Vandal athletics; it is the venue for football,  soccer, tennis, and indoor track & field. It was also home to Vandals basketball before the opening of Idaho Central Credit Union Arena in 2021. Built when Idaho was a member of the Big Sky Conference in all sports including football, the Kibbie Dome was long the smallest stadium in Division I FBS football.

Previously on this site was Neale Stadium, which opened in 1937 as an earthen horseshoe with wooden sideline grandstands. After 32 seasons, its bleachers were condemned for structural inadequacies due to erosion in the summer of 1969. After an idle 1969 football season, it was destroyed (by suspected arson) on November 22, 1969. After two years away at nearby Rogers Field in Pullman, the new outdoor "Idaho Stadium" opened on October 9, 1971, with concrete grandstands; the Vandals responded with a victory over Idaho State, an 8–3 season, and the Big Sky title.

Tartan Turf, similar to AstroTurf, was installed in 1972 with the roll-up mechanism; the arched roof and vertical end walls were completed in time for the 1975 home opener on September 27, enclosing the stadium to become the Kibbie Dome. The seating capacity is 16,000 for football games, 7,000 for basketball games (in a configuration known as the "Cowan Spectrum" since 2001), and 7,500 for concerts. Its innovative roof won the Outstanding Structural Engineering Achievement award from the ASCE in 1976.

The original Tartan Turf was replaced with AstroTurf in 1990 and lasted until 2007, when it was replaced with "Real Grass Pro," an infilled synthetic turf (similar to FieldTurf). In 2009, the Kibbie Dome began a multi-phase renovation with millions of dollars of improvements, primarily for safety. The primary change was the entire west wall; its aged dry plywood panels were replaced with non-flammable translucent plastic (upper) and opaque aluminum (lower). New field-level exits were also installed. The east wall was replaced in 2011 and a new press box was built above the north grandstand; the former press box area above the south grandstand was converted to premium seating (Litehouse Center).

Idaho Central Credit Union Arena 
Idaho Central Credit Union Arena (ICCU Arena), located immediately to the north of the Kibbie Dome, became the new home of Vandals men's and women's basketball for the 2021–22 season. The university had attempted to build a new arena to replace Memorial Gym for over 50 years, but nothing came of the plans until 2018, when a $10 million naming gift from Idaho Central Credit Union encouraged the administration to go forward with construction. Ground was broken the following year. The 4,200-seat facility, costing about $51 million, is primarily made from engineered wood, with the superstructure consisting mainly of over 850 Douglas fir beams prepared from trees logged at the university's experimental forest. Several major forest products companies assisted in the construction process. The arena opened for a media tour on September 29, 2021, with the basketball teams using the main arena and an included practice court during preseason practice. The first event in the new arena was a men's basketball exhibition against NAIA member Evergreen State on October 29. The first regular-season game was a men's game against Long Beach State on November 10. This game served as a homecoming for Beach head coach Dan Monson, son of former longtime Vandals head coach Don Monson and himself a former Vandals football player.

Golf course
The UI Golf Course was established in 1933 on the southwest edge of campus and opened as nine holes in 1937. It was expanded to 18 holes in 1970 and its current clubhouse was built in 1969.

Arboretum and botanical garden

Referred to as "Tree City" or "The Arb" by U of I students, the Arboretum is a  site adjacent to the golf course which features display gardens, ponds, and a variety of trees and plants from Asia, Europe, and North America.

The original Shattuck Arboretum was conceived in 1910 by Charles H. Shattuck, the head of the forestry department. His efforts gradually turned a treeless slope southwest of the Administration Building into a dense forest grove. The arboretum was named for Shattuck in 1933, two years after his death. Until the late 1960s, this area provided the background for left & center field of the MacLean  baseball field, whose infield was displaced by the construction of the new College of Education buildings, which were completed in 1968.

The newer portion of the arboretum complex is south of the Shattuck area, in the valley below the president's residence (1967), along the eastern edge of the campus' 18-hole golf course.

Student Recreation Center
Designed by NAC Architecture and opened in 2002, the  Student Recreation Center boasts a  freestanding climbing wall, as well as a weight training area, cardio,  of climbing area, jogging track, and two full-size gyms. The Rec Center hours are set to meet the schedules of users including students, faculty and staff. The Student Recreation Center offers a number of wellness classes including zumba, TRX, cycling, gravity, belly dancing and yoga. The planned Phase Two of the project includes adding a swimming pool, but has been delayed due to funding problems.

The recreation center is located on the corner of Paradise Creek Street and Line Street north of the Theophilus Tower dormitory, an area which formerly housed maintenance buildings.

Library
The U of I Library is the state's largest library, with more than 1.4 million books, periodicals, government documents, maps, videorecordings, and special collections. The Library's Special Collections and Archives houses a collection of first edition works by Sir Walter Scott, as well as more than 1200 texts by and about the author. The Library also has materials by many famous Idahoans, including Ezra Pound, Vardis Fisher, Frank Bruce Robinson, and Carol Ryrie Brink of Moscow. Digitized historic photographs from the University of Idaho campus and the state of Idaho, yearbooks, and the student newspaper the Argonaut, can be found on the Library's Digital Initiatives website.

Directly north of the Memorial Gymnasium and built on the former site of tennis courts, the library opened in 1957, relocating from the south wing of the Administration Building. The U of I post office station was formerly housed in its lower northwest corner; it was moved to the new U of I bookstore in 1990. The U of I Library was expanded by 50% in 1993 and rededicated in 1994. The first floor underwent major renovation during the 2016 academic year to up-date collaborative spaces and technology.

Memorial Gymnasium

The Tudor Gothic-style Memorial Gymnasium is another U of I icon, known for its whimsical athletic gargoyles perched along the brick building's ledges. The multi-purpose "Mem Gym" has a modest seating capacity of only 1,500. Opened in 1928 to honor the Idaho citizens who died in World War I (1917–18) and Spanish–American War (1898), the heavily buttressed structure was designed by the chairman of the university's architecture department, David C. Lang.

Memorial Gym was the primary venue for men's basketball until January 1976, following the enclosure of the Kibbie Dome the previous fall. The women's team hosted its home games in the gym until 2001, when the Cowan Spectrum (inside the Kibbie Dome) was completed. The gym is still in active use today as the home court for the women's volleyball team, and was also used for early-season basketball games before the opening of ICCU Arena. It is also used extensively for intramurals and open recreation, as well as for ROTC.

The MacLean baseball field was located directly south of the Memorial Gym, until its infield was displaced by the construction of the College of Education building in 1967. The catcher and batter faced southwest (towards the pitcher's mound); the right field line was just south of the gym, running east–west. The background of left and center field was the Shattuck Arboretum. The new baseball field (Guy Wicks Field) was relocated northwest, to the vast intramural fields near the Moscow-Pullman Highway, northwest of the Wallace Complex dormitories. The batter and catcher now faced southeast, toward campus, an unorthodox configuration resulting in a difficult sun field for the left side of the defense (the recommended alignment is east-northeast). Due to budget constraints, varsity baseball was dropped following the 1980 season, but continued for a while as a club sport. MacLean was also the venue for football until the opening of Neale Stadium in 1937.

The swim center and physical education building (formerly known as the "Women's Gym"), which both opened in 1970, are adjacent to the south side of the gym. Before the swim center was opened, the Mem Gym had a narrow swimming pool in its basement.

In 1977, the Memorial Gymnasium was added to the National Register of Historic Places after only 49 years.

Under the elms
Rare Camperdown elms line the walkway between the Music building, Nichols Building (home to Family and Consumer Sciences) and Administration Building. These "upside-down" trees have been on campus for over 80 years and are among few of their kind in the Northwest. The weeping branches and knotty trunk are formed by being grafted upwards.

Steam plant
Built in 1926, the steam plant provides heat to U of I buildings from a single location. Originally designed to burn coal, then oil, then natural gas, the plant was modified in 1986 to burn waste wood chips left over from local sawmills. The use of wood has significantly reduced the emissions of the plant, as well as cut costs to heat the campus. The plant is shut down twice a year for cleaning and maintenance. As a side benefit of the heat generation, the steam pipes are routed underneath campus walkways and provide clean (and ice free) walkways throughout the north Idaho winter.

University housing
The University of Idaho offers various options for on-campus housing, including four residence halls (Wallace Residence Center, Theophilus Tower, McConnell Hall, and Living Learning Communities) for students and Apartments (South Hill Apartments, South Hill Vista Apartments, and Elmwood Apartments) for non-traditional students or those who need special accommodations.

Usually apartments are only available to single parents, married couples (with or without children), law students, and students over 21 years old. Theophilus Tower, 3 of the 4 Wallace Residence wings, and one LLC building is only available for first-year students. Students can also live in a Fraternity or Sorority chapter on campus. Summer housing is available but choices are limited.

Ridenbaugh Hall
The Board of Regents authorized the construction of Ridenbaugh Hall as the first women's dormitory on campus. Completed in 1901 at a cost of $17,000, it is the oldest extant building on campus. It was designed by architect Willis A. Ritchie of Spokane, who also designed the Spokane County Courthouse. The building used stone quarried in Latah County for the exterior walls. It was also used as a space for domestic science classes until 1927 when it became a men's dormitory. The building was later used for music practice rooms and currently houses the Art and Architecture gallery.

Ridenbaugh Hall was the first U of I campus structure to be named after a person. The hall was dedicated to "the young women of Idaho" in honor of Mary E. Ridenbaugh (1857–1926) of Boise, who was vice president of the U of I Board of Regents, and served as regent from 1901 to 1907. The building was placed on the National Register of Historic Places in 1977.

Student life

U of I is a rural, residential campus, with four residence hall communities to choose from on campus, as well as 27 housed fraternities and sororities. On-campus residence is currently required for freshmen, and many other upperclassmen choose to live on campus in the Greek system or the residence halls.

Apartments on campus are available for families, married couples, graduate students, law students, and non-traditional students. The "Law Cluster" is a group of apartments reserved for law students, allowing for a community close to campus for law students, facilitating study groups.

Transportation

All students are permitted to have cars on campus (parking permits are required for most on-campus parking), which is also served by public transportation. The Intermodal Transit Center (aka ITC) of City of Moscow was built in 2013, which located in Railroad St, on-campus. In town bus services are free of fares, available during daytime of weekdays. The office of university Parking and Transportation Services (aka PTS) is also located in the ITC.

Student organizations
Many students participate in a wide variety of over 200 clubs and organizations.  Clubs range from sports to faith based, and everything in between. Palousafest is a fair that brings clubs and students together, and is a way for students to find out more about how to get involved with extracurricular activities. The fair is usually the weekend just before the fall semester starts. The literary journal Fugue is published at the university.

Greek life
The University of Idaho is home to 18 housed fraternities, 10 housed sororities, and 6 multicultural Greek organizations that make up more than 20% of the student population, and over 44% of the students who live on campus (around 1,800 students). This fraternity and sorority community is unique in that it's one of the few that allow freshmen to move in first semester as a living option, as opposed to waiting until second semester or sophomore year. This system works very well for the university and the students, with the Greeks having the highest GPA for 9 consecutive semesters as of Spring 2011.

Housed sororities
(Panhellenic Council)

Housed fraternities
(Interfraternity Council)

Multicultural Greeks
Multicultural Greek Council

Moscow

Moscow is a college town, with 23,800 residents as of the 2010 census. Also a commercial and agricultural center, it is located in the rolling hills of the Palouse region of north central Idaho. U of I campus is adjacent to the southwest side of town; most stores, restaurants, and bars are within easy walking distance.

Academics
From 1896 through May 2011, the University of Idaho granted 80,233 bachelor's degrees, 21,734 master's degrees, 2,694 doctoral degrees, 240 honorary degrees, 1,164 specialist degrees, and 3,654 law degrees.

The university is organized into ten colleges; two are exclusively for graduate students (Law & Graduate Studies).

In July 2002, the College of Letters & Science was split into two separate colleges: the College of Science and the College of Letters, Arts, and Social Sciences (CLASS). Concurrently, the College of Mines and Earth Resources was discontinued; its programs were split between the College of Engineering and the new College of Science.

The College of Law opened a second campus in Boise in 2010. Initially, the Boise campus only offered third-year classes. It expanded to offer second-year classes in 2014, and as of  law students can take their entire three-year curriculum at either location.

 College of Agricultural and Life Sciences - (renamed 2001, formerly Agriculture (1901))
 College of Art and Architecture - (1981)
 College of Business and Economics - (1925)
 College of Education, Health and Human Sciences - (1920)
 College of Engineering - (1911)
 College of Graduate Studies
 College of Law - (1909)
 College of Letters, Arts, and Social Sciences - (2002, formed after split of Letters and Science (1900))
 College of Natural Resources - (renamed 2000, formerly Forestry, Wildlife, & Range Sciences, originally Forestry (1917))
 College of Science - (2002, formed after split of Letters and Science, and dissolution of Mines and Earth Resources)

Rankings and recognition

U.S. News & World Report ranks U of I tied for 89th among the nation's best public universities and tied for 179th among the best national universities in its 2020 report.
A Top 50 America's Best Value College - U.S. News & World Report
One of America's Top 100 Best Public Colleges  - U.S. News & World Report
The University of Idaho is included in the 2021 edition of Princeton Review's "Best 386 Colleges." The Princeton Review also ranks U-Idaho as one of the nation's top 286 environmentally responsible colleges.
Named by the Corporation for National and Community Service to the 2010 President's Higher Education Community Service Honor Roll for exemplary service efforts—more than 3,800 students volunteered more than 150,000 hours to community and service-learning. This was the fifth consecutive year Idaho has earned this highest federal recognition for its commitment to service-learning and civic engagement.

Certification programs

 Data Analytics (open exclusively to graduate students)
 Geographic Information Systems/Sciences.

Athletics

Notable alumni

See also

List of land-grant universities
List of forestry universities and colleges
ViEWER freeware created by University of Idaho researchers

Notes

References

External links

 
 University of Idaho Athletics website
 

 
Land-grant universities and colleges
University of Idaho
University of Idaho
University of Idaho
Universities and colleges accredited by the Northwest Commission on Colleges and Universities
Education in Latah County, Idaho
Tourist attractions in Latah County, Idaho
Educational institutions established in 1889
1889 establishments in Idaho Territory
Public universities and colleges in Idaho